Macquarie Fields is a suburb of Sydney, in the state of New South Wales, Australia. Macquarie Fields is located 38 kilometres south-west of the Sydney central business district, in the local government area of the City of Campbelltown and is part of the Macarthur region.

Macquarie Fields is surrounded by bushland. Nearby Macquarie Links, is a high-security housing estate beside an international standard golf course. The suburb has multiple high schools including Macquarie Fields High School and James Meehan High School.

History
The original inhabitants of the Macquarie Fields area were the Darug people of western Sydney. The rich soil of the area was home to an abundance of plants which in turn attracted animals such as kangaroos and emus, both of which along with this part with yams and other native vegetables and fruit were part of the diet of the Darug. They lived in small huts called gunyahs, made spears, tomahawks and boomerangs for hunting and had an elaborate system of tribal law and rituals with its origins in the Dreamtime. However, following the arrival of the First Fleet in 1788, they were pushed off their land by the British settlers.

Macquarie Fields was named by early landholder James Meehan in honour of the Governor of New South Wales, Lachlan Macquarie. The area was surveyed by Meehan in the early 19th century. Although transported to Australia as a convict for his role in the Irish Rebellion of 1798, Meehan had trained as a surveyor in Ireland and in 1803 was appointed an assistant to NSW Surveyor-General Charles Grimes. In 1806 he was granted a full pardon and in 1810 became Surveyor-General. For his work, he was granted a number of parcels of land including  in what is now Macquarie Fields and neighboring suburbs. He used the rich soil to grow cereal crops, fruit trees and to graze livestock.

The property changed hands a couple of times after Meehan's death and in the 1840s, Samuel Terry built a Regency mansion, Macquarie Fields House, which still stands to this day. It is now listed on the Register of the National Estate. In 1883, then owner William Phillips subdivided the land to create a new town he called Glenwood Estate with grand boulevards and fine buildings. A railway station was added to the line in 1888 but the depression of the 1890s meant the grand town failed to materialize with only a few small houses built on the lots. In the next Great Depression of the 1930s, the area became popular with the homeless who made makeshift huts, not unlike those of the earlier Darug people.

After World War II, the village grew steadily. A public school was opened in 1958 and by 1971, the population reached 3700. In the mid-1970s, a large Housing Commission development was built on the east side of town and given the suburb names of Bunbury (later Guise) and Curran after the local creek. Residents of the privately owned areas of Macquarie Fields were strongly opposed to the new developments being included in their suburb and this continued well into the 1980s. Since that time, local authorities have tried to blend the area into a single suburb. Private housing developments sprung up further around and the weight of population contributed to a larger town centre.

21st century

In 2005, riots were sparked by a high-speed police pursuit on 25 February through the Glenquarie housing estate in Macquarie Fields. The chase resulted in the driver, 20-year-old Jesse Kelly, crashing the stolen vehicle into a tree and killing his two passengers, 17-year-old Dylan Raywood and 19-year-old Matthew Robertson.

Heritage listings 
Macquarie Fields has a number of heritage-listed sites, including:
 Quarter Sessions Road: Macquarie Field House

Population
According to the 2016 census, 13,714 people live in Macquarie Fields .
 Aboriginal and Torres Strait Islander people made up 4.1% of the population. 
 53.6% of people were born in Australia. The most common countries of birth were Bangladesh 5.2%, India 4.3%, New Zealand 3.0%, Fiji 2.6% and Philippines 2.6%.   
 51.8% of people only spoke English at home. Other languages spoken at home included Bengali 7.1%, Arabic 4.2%, Hindi 3.4%, Samoan 3.3% and Marathi 2.3%. 
 The most common responses for religion were Catholic 19.8%, No Religion 16.3%, Islam 12.8% and Anglican 12.1%.
 The most common occupations Clerical and Administrative Workers 15.6%, Labourers 14.6%, Professionals 14.2%, Machinery Operators and Drivers 14.2%, and Technicians and Trades Workers 12.5%.

Transport

Macquarie Fields railway station is serviced by the Airport & South Line of the Sydney Trains network.

Macquarie Fields is serviced by four Interline bus routes:
870 Campbelltown Hospital to Liverpool Station
871 Campbelltown Hospital to Liverpool Station
872 Campbelltown Hospital to Liverpool Station
876 Eucalyptus Drive to Macquarie Fields Station

Sport and recreation
The town is home to Macquarie Fields Leisure Centre, which contains an indoor aquatic center and an outdoor Olympic sized swimming pool. It also encompasses a gymnasium and indoor sports facilities.
There is also a number of sporting fields in the town. Sporting fields include Bensley Road, Hazlet Oval, Monarch Oval and Third Avenue.

Services
Macquarie Fields contains the WorkVentures Connect Centre at Macquarie Fields.

References

External links
 History of Macquarie Fields, from the City of Campbelltown Council.
  [CC-By-SA]

 
Suburbs of Sydney